Maʿna an-Nakba is a book by Constantin Zureiq published by  in Beirut in 1948. It coined the term Nakba to describe the Palestinian catastrophe following the war of 1948.

History 
While the war on the Palestinians was still raging, Zureiq became one of the first to describe the developments of the war and to use the term Nakba ( 'disaster' or 'catastrophe').

Translation 
It was translated as The Meaning of the Disaster by R. Bayley Winder, published 1956 in Beirut (Khayat).

References 

1948 books
Arabic-language books
Books about the Nakba